The Grey Nuns of Montreal is a Canadian religious institute of Roman Catholic religious sisters.

Grey Nuns may also refer to:

 Grey Nuns Community Hospital, an acute care hospital in Edmonton, Alberta, Canada
 Grey Nuns Hospital (now Pasqua Hospital), a hospital in Regina, Saskatchewan, Canada
 Grey Nuns' Hospital, a hospital that operated from 1695 to 1880 in Montreal, Quebec, Canada
 Grey Nuns Motherhouse, a Concordia University residence in Montreal
 Sisters of Charity of the Blessed Virgin Mary, a national institute founded in the United States by Mother Mary Frances Clarke